Paraplatyptilia azteca is a moth of the family Pterophoridae that is known from Mexico.

Adults are on wing in July.

References

azteca
Moths described in 1996
Endemic Lepidoptera of Mexico
Moths of North America